The following is a list of events affecting American television in 2023. Events listed include television show debuts, finales, and cancellations; channel launches, closures, and re-brandings; stations changing or adding their network affiliations; information on controversies, business transactions, and carriage disputes; and deaths of those who made various contributions to the medium.

Notable events

January

February

March

Future events

April

May

June

September

Television shows

Shows debuting in 2023

Shows changing networks

Milestone episodes and anniversaries

Shows returning in 2023

Shows ending in 2023

Entering syndication in 2023
A list of programs (current or canceled) that have accumulated enough episodes (between 65 and 100) or seasons (three or more) to be eligible for off-network syndication and/or basic cable runs.

Networks and services

Launches

Conversions and rebrandings

Closures

Television stations

Station launches

Subchannel launches

Stations changing network affiliations

Subchannels changing network affiliations

Deaths

January

February

March

References

Notes

External links
List of 2023 American television series at IMDb